Les Haupt (born 29 March 1939) is a South African former cyclist. He competed in the 1000m time trial and tandem events at the 1960 Summer Olympics.

References

External links
 

1939 births
Living people
South African male cyclists
Olympic cyclists of South Africa
Cyclists at the 1960 Summer Olympics
Sportspeople from Cape Town